Farid Gayibov (born 24 April 1979) is the minister of Youth and Sports of Azerbaijan (2021), Vice-President of the National Olympic Committee of Azerbaijan (2021), President of European Gymnastics (2018),  member of the FIG Executive Committee, Chairman of UNESCO Intergovernmental Committee for Physical Education and Sport (2022).

Early life and education 
Gayibov was born in Baku on 24 April 1979. In 1995, he graduated from Baku Secondary School as No 1. In the same year, he entered as a Business Management faculty of Azerbaijan Institute of National Economy Management under the Cabinet of Ministers of the Republic of Azerbaijan.

In 1999, he obtained the Bachelor's degree in Business Management and graduated from the Master's degree in 2001. Président du Comité intergouvernemental de l'UNESCO dans le domen de la culture physique et le sport (2022).

Academic degree 
Gayibov obtained his PhD at the National State University of Physical Education, Sports and Health named after P.F. Lesgaft (St. Petersburg, Russia) in 2014.

Activity in the oil field 
Gayibov worked at the storehouse of the "Balakhanineft" Oil-and-gas Production Office of the State Oil Company of the Republic of Azerbaijan (SOCAR) from 2000 to 2001.

In 2001–2003, he took up the post of an economist at the planning department of the "Balakhanineft" Oil-and-gas Production Office of SOCAR.

Career in sports

Gymnastics 
In 2003-2005, Gayibov worked as the Sports and Logistics Manager at the Azerbaijan Gymnastics Federation (AGF).

During these years, he took an active part in the Local Organizing Committees of 3 World Cup events (2003/04/05) and the 27th World Championships (2005) in Rhythmic Gymnastics, as well as in the organization of International Judges' Course (2007) in Artistic Gymnastics held in Baku.

He worked as the AGF General Manager in 2005-2006.

Gayibov was elected as AGF's Secretary General at a regular portback election conference of the organization in 2006.

In 2006–2007, 2008–2009, and 2013–2014, he acted as an Executive Director (from Azerbaijan) within the Local Organizing Committees of 3 European Championships in Rhythmic Gymnastics (2007, 2009 & 2014) held in Baku.

He was elected as the FIG Council Member (within 2008-2012 Olympic Cycle) at the 77th FIG Congress (Helsinki, Finland, 17–19 October) in 2008.

He was re-elected as a Secretary General of Azerbaijan Gymnastics Federation at its Executive Committee's Meeting on 25 December 2010.

Gayibov was re-elected as the FIG Council Member at the 79th FIG Congress (Cancun, Mexico, 25–27 October) in 2012.

He was elected as the Vice-President of the European Union of Gymnastics (UEG) at its 25th Congress in Portorose (Slovenia, 6–7 December) in 2013. Consequently, he resigned from the membership of the FIG Council.

From 2013 to 2021, he was a member of the National Olympic Committee of Azerbaijan (NOC).

Gayibov was the organizer of the FIG Rhythmic Gymnastics Academy Level 1 (2013) and Level 2 (2014) for Coaches, held in Baku in 2013 and 2014.

In 2014–2015, he took up a position of the Executive Director of the Local Organizing Committee of the Open Joint Azerbaijan Championships (2015) in 6 gymnastics disciplines held as a Test Event for the Baku 2015 First European Games.

He was an adviser on gymnastics disciplines competitions held within the framework of the Baku 2015 First European Games within 2014-2015.

Gayibov was re-elected as AGF Secretary General at its Executive Committee's Meeting on 24 December 2015.

In 2015–2016, he was an Executive Director of the Local Organizing Committees of the FIG Artistic Gymnastics Individual Apparatus ("Challenge" in 2016) World Cup AGF Trophy, FIG Rhythmic Gymnastics World Cup AGF Trophy, and FIG Trampoline Gymnastics World Cup AGF Trophy held in Baku in 2016 and 2017.

In 2016–2017, Gayibov acted as Executive Director of the Local Organizing Committee of the Rhythmic Gymnastics Intercontinental Judges' and International Judges' Courses, Men's Artistic Gymnastics International Judges' Course, and the FIG Council of the 4th Islamic Solidarity Games, which took place in Baku in 2017.

He has great experience in sports events' organizations on the National and International level in Rhythmic Gymnastics, Men's Artistic Gymnastics, Tumbling, and Acrobatic Gymnastics, from 2003; Women's Artistic Gymnastics, Trampoline Gymnastics, and Aerobic Gymnastics, from 2013.

Gayibov was a delegate of the UEG and FIG Congresses; member of the delegation for the Olympic Games (Beijing 2008, London 2012, and Rio 2016); head of  the Azerbaijani official delegations in different gymnastics disciplines during the European and World Championships; President of the Appeal Jury at different European Championships in gymnastics disciplines (as assigned) from 2014 to 2018.

He has been elected as the President of the European Union of Gymnastics (UEG) at its 27th portback election of Congress, held in Split, Croatia, on 1–2 December 2017. Consequently, Gayibov resigned from the position of AGF Secretary General.

Since 2018, he has been acting as the UEG President (renamed into European Gymnastics since 1 April 2020) and is automatically a member of the FIG Executive Committee.

As President of the European Gymnastics, Gayibov presides the meetings of its President’s Board, Executive Committee and General Assembly, represents the European Gymnastics at the FIG Executive Committee. Being a member of the FIG Executive Committee, he attended the Tokyo 2020 Olympic Games as the member of Jury of Appeal of gymnastics events. 

Gayibov was appointed as the Minister of Youth and Sports of the Republic of Azerbaijan in accordance with the resolution of the country’s President Ilham Aliyev in September 2021. 

In 2021, Gayibov was elected as the Vice-President of the National Olympic Committee of Azerbaijan at its VIII portback election General Assembly in 2021. 

In 2022, Gayibov was elected as the Chairman of UNESCO Intergovernmental Committee for Physical Education and Sport at its emergency meeting held at UNESCO Headquarters. 

Gayibov attended the 5th Ethnosport Forum, organized under the motto "The Reviving Traditional Sports" by the World Ethnosport Confederation and the Ministry of Youth and Sport of the Republic of Azerbaijan in Baku (March 5-6, 2022).  

He chaired the 3rd session of Organization of Islamic Cooperation Permanent Ministerial Council on Youth and Sports hosted in Baku (June 23, 2022).

Gayibov attended the Youth Summit of the Non-Aligned Movement organized in Baku (July 25-29, 2022) with the support of the Ministry of Youth and Sport of the Republic of Azerbaijan.

Farid Gayibov has been re-elected as President of the European Gymnastics. The election was held in the Portuguese city of Albufeira during the 29th European Gymnastics Congress (December, 2022).

Farid Gayibov was re-elected as President of the European Gymnastics with a 100% percent majority at its 29th Congress held in Albufeira (Portugal) on December 2 & 3, 2022.

Lecturer Activity 

 Gayibov was a lecturer in “International Sports Management System and Olympic movement” at the Azerbaijan State Academy of Physical Education and Sports in March-May 2019. 

 He led the Research, Communication and Innovation Internship for Master Degree students of the Sports Management Faculty at the Azerbaijan State Academy of Physical Education and Sports in September-October 2020.

Awards and prizes 
He was awarded with the FIG Bronze Distinction as a twice-elected member to the FIG Council (2008 and 2012) at the closing of the 81st Congress of the FIG in Tokyo, Japan, in October.

Gayibov was awarded with the FIG "Recognition" Medal by this organization at the 17th FIG Council, which was held in Baku in 2017.

On 18 December 2017, he was awarded with the "Honorary Diploma of the President of the Republic of Azerbaijan" for his contribution to the development of sports in our country according to the order of the President of the Republic of Azerbaijan Ilham Aliyev.

Gayibov was awarded with the title of "The Year`s Sports Figure” in 2018 and 2022 by Sports Research Centre within the framework of “The Year’s Winners” project.

Personal life 
He is married and has two sons and one daughter.

See also
European Union of Gymnastics 
Azerbaijan Gymnastics Federation

References

External links

 

1979 births
Living people
Azerbaijan State University of Economics alumni
Government ministers of Azerbaijan